Marginitermes is a genus of termites in the family Kalotermitidae. There are at least three described species in Marginitermes.

Species
These three species belong to the genus Marginitermes:
 Marginitermes absitus Scheffrahn & Postle, 2013
 Marginitermes cactiphagus Myles, 1997
 Marginitermes hubbardi (Banks in Banks & Snyder, 1920) (light western drywood termite)

References

Further reading

 

Termites
Articles created by Qbugbot